Shahrukh Husain, born 28 April 1950, is a Pakistani author who specializes in fiction, non-fiction, and screenwriting. She is also a psychotherapist, folklorist, and storyteller. She resides in London. She is a Fellow of the Royal Literary Fund.

Select filmography
Screenplay for In Custody (1993), adapted from the novel of the same name by Anita Desai. It is a Merchant Ivory Productions film directed by Ismail Merchant. She also wrote an episode for Beecham House.

Select books
A Restless Wind (2013)
The Goddess: Power, Sexuality, and the Feminine Divine (2003)
Daughters of the Moon: Witch Tales from Around the World (1993) 
Handsome Heroines (1996).

References

External links 
"Shahrukh Husain" at the Royal Literary Fund.
Biography from Barefoot Books
Penguin biography
"Shahrukh Husain Interview" at writewords.org, 16 December 2005.

1950 births
Living people
Pakistani women writers
Pakistani folklorists
Pakistani storytellers
Pakistani novelists
Pakistani screenwriters
Pakistani women novelists
Women folklorists